The  is a third-sector railway company funded by the city of Yokohama, Kanagawa Prefecture, and Tokyu Corporation.

The company oversees the Minatomirai Line and the Kodomonokuni Line. Train crews and operations are contracted out to Tokyu Corporation.

History
The company was founded on 29 March 1989, and on 19 April 1990, received government approval to operate the Minatomirai Line. On 1 August 1997, the company acquired the Kodomonokuni Line. The Minatomirai Line opened on 1 February 2004.

References

External links 

  

 
Companies based in Yokohama
Railway companies established in 1989